Rotundrela is a genus of spiders in the family Zodariidae. It was first described in 1999 by Jocqué. , it contains 2 species, both from South Africa.

References

Zodariidae
Araneomorphae genera
Spiders of South Africa